"Mafia" is an informal term that is used to describe criminal organizations that bear a strong similarity to the original "Mafia", the Italian Mafia. The central activity of such an organization would be the arbitration of disputes between criminals as well as the organization and enforcement of illicit agreements between criminals through the use of or threat of violence. Mafias often engage in secondary activities such as gambling, loan sharking, drug-trafficking, prostitution, and fraud.

The term "mafia" was originally applied to the Sicilian Mafia. However, the term has since expanded to encompass other organizations of similar methods and purpose, e.g., "the Russian Mafia" or "the Japanese Mafia". The term was coined by the press and is informal; the criminal organizations themselves have their own names (e.g. the Sicilian Mafia and the related Italian-American Mafia refer to their organizations as "Cosa Nostra"; the "Japanese Mafia" calls itself "Ninkyō dantai" but is more commonly known as "Yakuza" by the public; and "Russian Mafia" groups often call themselves "Bratva").

When used alone and without any qualifier, "Mafia" or "the Mafia" typically refers to either the Sicilian Mafia or the Italian-American Mafia and sometimes Italian organized crime in general (e.g., Camorra, 'Ndrangheta, etc.).

Etymology
The word mafia derives from the Sicilian adjective , which, roughly translated, means "swagger", but can also be translated as "boldness" or "bravado". In reference to a man,  (mafioso in Italian) in 19th century Sicily signified "fearless", "enterprising", and "proud", according to scholar Diego Gambetta. In reference to a woman, however, the feminine-form adjective  means 'beautiful' or 'attractive'.

Because Sicily was once an Islamic emirate from 831 to 1072, mafia may have come to Sicilian through Arabic, though the word's origins are uncertain. Possible Arabic roots of the word include:
 = exempted. In Islamic law, jizya, is the yearly tax imposed on non-Muslims residing in Muslim lands. And people who pay it are "exempted" from prosecution.
màha  = quarry, cave; especially the mafie, the caves in the region of Marsala, which acted as hiding places for persecuted Muslims and later served other types of refugees, in particular Giuseppe Garibaldi's "Redshirts" after their embarkment on Sicily in 1860 in the struggle for Italian unification.
 = aggressive boasting, bragging
 = rejected, considered to be the most plausible derivation;  developed into marpiuni (swindler) to marpiusu and finally mafiusu.
 = safety, protection
 = the name of an Arab tribe that ruled Palermo. The local peasants imitated these Arabs and as a result the tribe's name entered the popular lexicon. The word mafia was then used to refer to the defenders of Palermo during the Sicilian Vespers against rule of the Capetian House of Anjou on 30 March 1282.
, meaning "place of shade". The word "shade" meaning refuge or derived from refuge.  After the Normans destroyed the Saracen rule in Sicily in the eleventh century, Sicily became feudalistic. Most Arab smallholders became serfs on new estates, with some escaping to "the Mafia." It became a secret refuge.

The public's association of the word with the criminal secret society was perhaps inspired by the 1863 play  ("The Mafiosi of the Vicaria") by Giuseppe Rizzotto and Gaspare Mosca. The play is about a Palermo prison gang with traits similar to the Mafia: a boss, an initiation ritual, and talk of "umirtà" (omertà or code of silence) and "pizzu" (a codeword for extortion money). The play had great success throughout Italy. Soon after, the use of the term "mafia" began appearing in the Italian state's early reports on the phenomenon. The word made its first official appearance in 1865 in a report by the prefect of Palermo .

Definitions
The term "mafia" was never officially used by Sicilian mafiosi, who prefer to refer to their organization as "Cosa Nostra". Nevertheless, it is typically by comparison to the groups and families that comprise the Sicilian Mafia that other criminal groups are given the label. Giovanni Falcone, an anti-Mafia judge murdered by the Sicilian Mafia in 1992, objected to the conflation of the term "Mafia" with organized crime in general:

Mafias as private protection firms
Scholars such as Diego Gambetta and Leopoldo Franchetti have characterized the Sicilian Mafia as a cartel of private protection firms whose primary business is protection racketeering: they use their fearsome reputation for violence to deter people from swindling, robbing, or competing with those who pay them for protection. For many businessmen in Sicily, they provide an essential service when they cannot rely on the police and judiciary to enforce their contracts and protect their properties from thieves (this is often because they are engaged in black market deals).

Scholars have observed that many other societies around the world have criminal organizations of their own that provide the same sort of protection service. For instance, in Russia after the collapse of communism, the state security system had all but collapsed, forcing businessmen to hire criminal gangs to enforce their contracts and protect their properties from thieves. These gangs are popularly called "the Russian Mafia" by foreigners, but they prefer to go by the term krysha.

In his analysis of the Sicilian Mafia, Gambetta provided the following hypothetical scenario to illustrate the Mafia's function in the Sicilian economy.  Suppose a grocer wants to buy meat from a butcher without paying sales tax to the government. Because this is a black market deal, neither party can take the other to court if the other cheats.  The grocer is afraid that the butcher will sell him rotten meat.  The butcher is afraid that the grocer will not pay him.  If the butcher and the grocer can't get over their mistrust and refuse to trade, they would both miss out on an opportunity for profit.  Their solution is to ask the local mafioso to oversee the transaction, in exchange for a fee proportional to the value of the transaction but below the legal tax. If the butcher cheats the grocer by selling rotten meat, the mafioso will punish the butcher. If the grocer cheats the butcher by not paying on time and in full, the mafioso will punish the grocer. Punishment might take the form of a violent assault or vandalism against property. The grocer and the butcher both fear the mafioso, so each honors their side of the bargain.  All three parties profit.

Mafia-type organizations under Italian law
Introduced by Pio La Torre, article 416-bis of the Italian Penal Code defines a Mafia-type association (Associazione di Tipo Mafioso) as one where "those belonging to the association exploit the potential for intimidation which their membership gives them, and the compliance and omertà which membership entails and which lead to the committing of crimes, the direct or indirect assumption of management or control of financial activities, concessions, permissions, enterprises and public services for the purpose of deriving profit or wrongful advantages for themselves or others."

International
Mafia-proper can refer to either:

Italy

Other Italian criminal organizations include:
Banda della Magliana and Mafia Capitale, in Lazio
Basilischi, in Basilicata
Camorra, in Campania
Cosa Nostra in Sicily
Mala del Brenta, in Veneto
'Ndrangheta, in Calabria, widely considered the richest and most powerful mafia in the world.
Sacra Corona Unita, in Apulia
Società foggiana, an offshoot of Sacra Corona Unita
Stidda, in Sicily

Other countries

References

Sources
Albanese, Jay S., Das, Dilip K. & Verma, Arvind (2003). Organized Crime: World Perspectives. Prentice Hall. 
 Coluccello, Rino (2016). Challenging the Mafia Mystique: Cosa Nostra from Legitimisation to Denunciation, Palgrave Macmillan, 

 Hess, Henner (1998). Mafia & Mafiosi: Origin, Power and Myth. London: Hurst & Co Publishers. 
  Lo Schiavo, Giuseppe Guido (1964), Cento anni di mafia, Rome: Vito Bianco Editore
 Lupo, Salvatore (2009), The History of the Mafia, New York: Columbia University Press, 
  Mosca, Gaetano (1901/2015). Che cosa è la mafia?, Messina: Il Grano,  (See Full text in Italian and the English translation for a background on the publication)
 Mosca, Gaetano (1901/2014). "What is Mafia", M&J, 2014. Translation of the book "Che cosa è la Mafia", Giornale degli Economisti, July 1901, pp. 236–62. 
 Paoli, Letizia (2003). Mafia Brotherhoods: Organized Crime, Italian Style. Oxford/New York: Oxford University Press. 
 Seindal, René (1998). Mafia: Money and Politics in Sicily, 1950-1997. Copenhagen: Museum Tusculanum Press. 
 Servadio, Gaia (1976). Mafioso: a history of the Mafia from its origins to the present day. London: Secker & Warburg. 
 Wang, Peng (2017). The Chinese Mafia: Organized Crime, Corruption, and Extra-Legal Protection. Oxford: Oxford University Press.

External links

 

 
Italian words and phrases